Events from the year 1870 in Canada.

Incumbents

Crown 
 Monarch – Victoria

Federal government 
 Governor General – John Young, 1st Baron Lisgar
 Prime Minister – John A. Macdonald
 Parliament – 1st

Provincial governments

Lieutenant governors 
Lieutenant Governor of Manitoba – Adams George Archibald (from May 20)
Lieutenant Governor of New Brunswick – Lemuel Allan Wilmot
Lieutenant Governor of Nova Scotia – Charles Hastings Doyle
Lieutenant Governor of Ontario – William Pearce Howland
Lieutenant Governor of Quebec – Narcisse-Fortunat Belleau

Premiers 
Premier of Manitoba – Alfred Boyd (from September 16)
Premier of New Brunswick – Andrew Rainsford Wetmore (until June 9) then George Edwin King
Premier of Nova Scotia – William Annand
Premier of Ontario – John Sandfield Macdonald
Premier of Quebec – Pierre-Joseph-Olivier Chauveau

Territorial governments

Lieutenant governors 
 Lieutenant Governor of the Northwest Territories – William McDougall (until May 10) then Adams George Archibald

Events
March 4 – Thomas Scott is executed by Riel's provisional government in the Red River Colony.
May 12 – The Canadian Parliament's Manitoba Act receives royal assent. The act provides for the establishment of the province Manitoba when Rupert's Land is transferred to Canada.
June–July – The 1870 New Brunswick election
July 15 – The British Privy Council's Rupert's Land and North-Western Territory Order transfers those territories to Canada, and Manitoba and the North-West Territories are established.
August 24 – The Wolseley expedition arrives at Upper Fort Garry, Manitoba 
September 16 – Alfred Boyd becomes the first premier of Manitoba.
December 27 – The 1870 Manitoba election

Arts and literature

Births

May 14 – Richard Langton Baker, politician (d.1951)
May 21 – Leonard Percy de Wolfe Tilley, lawyer, politician and 20th Premier of New Brunswick (d.1947)
June 18 – Howard Ferguson, politician and 9th Premier of Ontario (d.1946)

July 3 – R. B. Bennett, lawyer, businessman, politician, philanthropist and 11th Prime Minister of Canada (d.1947)
July 28 – Aubin-Edmond Arsenault, politician and Premier of Prince Edward Island (d.1968)
July 29 – George Dixon, boxer, first black world boxing champion in any weight class and first Canadian-born boxing champion (d.1909)
September 7 – James Tompkins, priest and educator (d.1953)
October 16 – Wallace Rupert Turnbull, engineer and inventor (d.1954)
November 10 – Harlan Carey Brewster, politician and Premier of British Columbia (d.1918)
November 17 – Jean Prévost, politician (d. 1915) 
December 15 – Richard McBride, politician and Premier of British Columbia (d.1917)

Full date unknown
Thomas Langton Church, politician and Mayor of Toronto (d.1950)

Deaths
February 6 – William MacBean George Colebrooke, lieutenant governor of New Brunswick (b.1787)
March 4 – Thomas Scott, Orangemen (b.1842)
March 31 – Thomas Cooke, missionary, and the first Bishop of Trois Rivières (b.1792)
August 7 – François Lesieur Desaulniers, farmer and political figure (b.1785)
October 13 – Charles-François Baillargeon, Archbishops of Quebec (b.1798)
October 25 – Etienne-Michel Faillon, Catholic historian (b.1800)
December 23 – Théophile Hamel, painter (b.1817)

Historical documents
Metis List of Rights calls for Rupert's Land and the Northwest to become the Province of Assiniboia

President Louis Riel gives his first speech to the Red River provisional government

Doubtful about Louis Riel, Prime Minister Macdonald begins assembling a military force

MP praises liberal approach in creating Manitoba in House of Commons speech

Red River resident objects to amnesty for Louis Riel and other leaders

President Grant calls Canada unfriendly to U.S. fishers and shippers

Call for a state-supported "Dominion University" in Canada

McGill University's John William Dawson on science education abroad and its application to Canada

Reports of smallpox among Blackfoot, Cree and other nations

References

 
Years of the 19th century in Canada
Canada
1870 in North America